Jeffrey Addison Nuttall (8 July 1933 – 4 January 2004) was an English poet, performer, author, actor, teacher, painter, sculptor, jazz musician, anarchist and social commentator who was a key part of the British 1960s counter-culture. He was the brother of literary critic A. D. Nuttall.

Life and work
Nuttall was born in Clitheroe, Lancashire, and grew up in Orcop, a village in Herefordshire. He studied at Hereford College of Art,  (1949–1951) and Bath Academy of Art, Corsham Court (1951–1953)  He married Jane Louch, his former art teacher in 1954 and in the same year gained a teaching MA at The Institute of Education in London followed by National Service completed in 1956. With is family he moved to London in 1959 where he worked as a secondary school teacher in Finchley. He was active with the Campaign for Nuclear Disarmament (CND) until 1962, then inspired by Alexander Trocchi and Peter Currell Brown, he committed to making art to change society. Connecting with other avant-garde writers and artists in Group H  including Bob Cobbing, John Latham, and Bruce Lacey, his modernist/anarchist persuasions  found expression in painting, writing and poetry.  

In 1963 Nuttall produced the first of 17 issues of My Own Mag with contributions from William Burroughs. MOM was one of the first underground magazines which were a defining feature of the 1960s counterculture.

During 1965 Nuttall staged early Happenings at Better Books in London These included the sTigma environment with John Latham, Bruce Lacey, Islwyn Watkins and Criton Tomazos. Later in the same year he participated with Latham in the International Poetry Incarnation at the Albert Hall instigated by Allen Ginsberg.

An overload of creative work and marital difficulties caused Nuttall to retreat to the Abbey Art Centre where he formed The People Show in 1966, one of the first and longest lasting Performance Art groups. During 1967 he contributed regularly to International Times, and wrote Bomb Culture, his personal account and critical analysis of the birth of the alternative society. The book was published in 1968 and then in 1970 as a best selling Paladin paperback. During this time Nuttall was  teaching and writing in Norwich and would move first to Bradford College of Art in 1969 and then to Leeds Polytechnic Fine Art Department where he was a senior lecturer for ten years from 1970 to 1981. Nuttall was active in Performance Art collaborating with Rose McGuire (Priscilla Beecham), and influencing other performers and students including Marc Almond.  His presence in the Fine Art department did much to define the radical creative ethos at Leeds. 

Nuttall was the author of over 40 books. These included novels (Snipe's Spinster (1975)); poetry (Objects (1976)); cultural commentary (Common Factors/Vulgar Factions, with Rodick Carmichael (1977)); and biography (King Twist: A Portrait of Frank Randle (1978)). He was elected Chairman of the National Society of Poetry in 1975 and with Eric Mottram tried to introduce radical modernist poetry occasioning the Poetry Wars. From 1978 to 1981 Nuttall was poetry critic for The Guardian.

As Head of Fine Art at Liverpool Polytechnic 1981 to 1984 his tenure was marked by controversial teaching initiatives, residencies at Deakin University Australia  and increasing alcoholic consumption all of which contributed to his early departure in 1984. With his partner Amanda Porter he lived in Portugal from 1986 to 1987, producing paintings and ceramics exhibited at the Flowers Gallery in London. He continued writing, broadcasting, performing, playing jazz cornet and working with the People Show again. As a character actor he began taking cameo roles in film and television making 63 appearances between 1989 and 2004. 

With his last partner, Jill Richards, he moved to Abergavenny, Wales, in 1991, and later to Crickhowell. His creative output continued with soft sculptures, landscape paintings, poetry, and writing. His last two books were Art and the Degradation of Awareness (1999) and Selected Poems (2003). Jeff Nuttall died aged 70 on 4 January 2004 while waiting to perform with his Jazz band at the Chick and Hens pub in Abergavenny.

Literary Works

 Poems (1963), with Keith Musgrove
 The Limbless Virtuoso (1963), with Keith Musgrove
 The Change (1963), Allen Ginsberg (cover design)
 My Own Mag (1963–66)
 Poems I Want to Forget (1965)
 Come Back Sweet Prince: A Novelette (1966)
 Pieces of Poetry (1966)
 The Case of Isabel and the Bleeding Foetus (1967)
 Songs Sacred and Secular (1967)
 Bomb Culture (1968), Cultural criticism and memoir.
 Penguin Modern Poets 12 (1968), with Alan Jackson and William Wantling
 Journals (1968)
 Love Poems (1969)
 Mr. Watkins Got Drunk and Had to Be Carried Home: A Cut-up Piece (1969)
 Pig (1969)
 Jeff Nuttall: Poems 1962–1969 (1970)
 Oscar Christ and the Immaculate Conception (1970)
 George, Son of My Own Mag (1971)
 The Foxes' Lair (1972)
 Fatty Feedemall's Secret Self: A Dream (1975)
 The Anatomy of My Father's Corpse (1975)
 Man Not Man (1975)
 The House Party (1975)
 Snipe's Spinster (novel, 1975)
 Objects (1976)
 Common Factors, Vulgar Factions (1977), with Rodick Carmichael
 King Twist: a Portrait of Frank Randle (1978), biography of music hall comedian
 The Gold Hole (1978)
 What Happened to Jackson (1978)
 Grape Notes, Apple Music (1979)
 Performance Art (1979/80), memoirs and scripts, two volumes
 5X5 (1981), with Glen Baxter, Ian Breakwell, Ivor Cutler and Anthony Earnshaw (edited by Asa Benveniste)
 Muscle (1982)
 Visual Alchemy (1987), with Bohuslav Barlow
 The Bald Soprano. A Portrait of Lol Coxhill (1989)
 Art and the Degradation of Awareness (1999)
 Selected Poems (2003)

Selected filmography
 Scandal (1989) – Percy Murray, Club Owner
 Robin Hood (1991) – Friar Tuck
 Just like a Woman (1992) – Vanessa
 Damage (1992) – Trevor Leigh Davies MP
 The Baby of Mâcon (1993) – The Major Domo
 The Browning Version (1994) – Lord Baxter
 Captives (1994) – Harold
 Paparazzo (1995) – Lionel
 Beaumarchais (1996) – Benjamin Franklin
 Crimetime (1996) – Doctor
 Monk Dawson (1998) – Sir Hugh Stanten
 Plunkett & Macleane (1999) – Lord Morris
 The World Is Not Enough (1999) – Dr. Mikhail Arkov, a Russian nuclear physicist whom Bond goes undercover as.
 Octopus (2000) – Henry Campbell
 Anazapta (2002) – Priest

Further reading
 James Charnley, Anything But Dull: The Life and Art of Jeff Nuttall, Academica Press, Washington DC, London, 2022
 Douglas Field and Jay Jeff Jones (eds.) An Aesthetic of Obscenity: 5 Novels by Jeff Nuttall, Verbivoracious Press, Great Britain and Singapore, 2016
 Jonathon Green, Days in the Life: Voices From the English Underground 1961–1971, Heinemann, London, 1988
 Rozemin Keshvani, Axel Heil, Peter Weibel, Better Books/Better Bookz: Art, Anarchy, Apostasy, Counter-culture and the New Avant-garde, ZKM, Koenig Books, London, 2014
 Mark Long, People Show: Nobody Knows but Everybody Remembers, People Show, London, 2016
 Barry Miles, London Calling: A Countercultural History of London Since 1945, Atlantic, London, 2010
 James Riley, The Bad Trip, Dark Omens: New Worlds and the End of the Sixties, Icon Books, London, 2019

References

External links
 Michael Horovitz, "Jeff Nuttall – Author of 1968's Bomb Culture" (Obituary), The Guardian, 12 January 2004
 Biography and a poem
 Selected Poems listing
 People Show
 The Life and Works of Jeff Nuttall
 John May interviews Nuttall at the Chelsea Arts Club, 1985

 Off Beat: Jeff Nuttall and the International Underground
Stuart A. Rose Manuscript, Archives, and Rare Book Library, Emory University: Jeff Nuttall collection, 1962-1978
Anything But Dull: The Life and Art of Jeff Nuttall, Academica Press, Washington DC, London, 2003

1933 births
2004 deaths
Academics of Leeds Beckett University
Academics of Liverpool John Moores University
Beat Generation writers
British Poetry Revival
British conceptual artists
English anarchists
People from Clitheroe
English male poets
20th-century English poets
20th-century English male writers
21st-century English male writers